Tuve may refer to:

People

Surname
 Merle Tuve (1901–1982), American geophysicist
 Rosemond Tuve (1903–1964), American scholar of English literature

Given name
 Tuve Hasselquist (1816–1891), Swedish church leader
 Tuve Skånberg (born 1956), Swedish politician

Places
 Mount Tuve, Ellsworth Land, Antarctica
 Tuve, Sweden